Kuala Rajang may refer to:
Kuala Rajang (federal constituency), formerly represented in the Dewan Rakyat (1990–2008)
Kuala Rajang (state constituency), represented in the Sarawak State Legislative Assembly

See also
Rajang (disambiguation)